Komlevo is a rural locality (a village) in Gorod Vyazniki, Vyaznikovsky District, Vladimir Oblast, Russia. The population was 1 as of 2010.

Geography 
Komlevo is located 17 km southeast of Vyazniki (the district's administrative centre) by road. Kudryavtsevo is the nearest rural locality.

References 

Rural localities in Vyaznikovsky District